The mixed team sprint speed skating competition of the 2020 Winter Youth Olympics was held at Lake St. Moritz on 15 January 2020.

Results
The races were held at 11:30.

References 

 

Mixed team sprint